The 2013 Grand Prix el Salvador was a one-day women's cycle  race held in El Salvador on February 27, 2013 over 93.2 km from San Marcos to Zaragoza, La Libertad. The race has an UCI rating of 1.1 and was won by  the Italian Silvia Valsecchi of Be Pink.

Results

References

2013 in Salvadoran sport
2013 in women's road cycling
Grand Prix el Salvador